Kuldeep Raj is an Indian politician and member of the Bharatiya Janata Party. Raj was a member of the Jammu and Kashmir Legislative Assembly from the Hiranagar constituency in Kathua district.

References 

People from Kathua district
Bharatiya Janata Party politicians from Jammu and Kashmir
Living people
Jammu and Kashmir MLAs 2014–2018
Year of birth missing (living people)